Trentham railway station may refer to:
Trentham railway station, New Zealand in Trentham, New Zealand
Trentham railway station, Victoria, a former station in Trentham, Victoria, Australia
Trentham (Staffordshire) railway station, a former station in Trentham, Staffordshire, England
Trentham Gardens railway station, a former station serving Trentham Gardens, Staffordshire, England